"Who'll Be the One" is a song written by Harry Vanda and George Young. It was originally recorded by the Australian rock group the Easybeats in 1967.  The song was a follow up to their successful single "Friday On My Mind".  The single was a flop in the U.K., but it reached #12 on the Go-Set charts in Australia

Single track listing

Australian release

Who'll Be the One
Do You Have a Soul

UK release

Who'll Be the One
Saturday Night

Charts

Personnel

Musicians
Dick Diamonde – bass guitar
Gordon "Snowy" Fleet – drums
Harry Vanda – lead guitar
Stevie Wright – lead vocals
George Young – rhythm guitar

Technical
Shel Talmy – producer
Glyn Johns – engineer

References

External links
 Go-Set Charts

1967 singles
1967 songs
The Easybeats songs
Songs written by George Young (rock musician)
Parlophone singles
Albert Productions singles
Songs written by Harry Vanda
Song recordings produced by Shel Talmy